Leon A. "Chief" Miller (1895–1961) was an American football and lacrosse coach. He served as the head football coach at the City College of New York (CCNY) in 1943. He also served as the CCNY's head men's lacrosse coach from 1932 to 1960. As a college football player during the early 1910s, Miller was a teammate of Jim Thorpe at the Carlisle Indian School.

Head coaching record

References

1895 births
1961 deaths
Carlisle Indians football players
CCNY Beavers football coaches
College men's lacrosse coaches in the United States
People from Cherokee, North Carolina
Players of American football from North Carolina